Nargeszar-e Famur (also Romanized as Nargeszār-e Fāmūr; also known as Nargeszār and Qal‘eh-ye Moshīrī) is a village in Famur Rural District, Jereh and Baladeh District, Kazerun County, Fars Province, Iran. At the 2006 census, its population was 797, in 185 families.

References 

Populated places in Kazerun County